Srikalahasti Assembly constituency is a constituency of Andhra Pradesh Legislative Assembly, India. It is one among 7 constituencies in Tirupati district.

Biyyapu Madhusudhan Reddy of Yuvajana Sramika Rythu Congress Party is currently representing the constituency.

Overview
It is part of Tirupati Lok Sabha constituency along with another six Vidhan Sabha segments, namely, Sarvepalli, Gudur, Sullurpeta in Nellore district Venkatagiri and  Tirupati, Satyavedu in Chittoor district.

Mandals

Members of Legislative Assembly Srikalahasti

Election results

2004

2009

2014

2019

See also
 List of constituencies of Andhra Pradesh Vidhan Sabha

References

Assembly constituencies of Andhra Pradesh